Olive Carey (born Olive Fuller Golden; January 31, 1896 – March 13, 1988) was an American film and television actress, and the mother of actor Harry Carey Jr.

Early life
Carey was born Olive Fuller Golden in New York City, the daughter of Ada (Maxwell), who was from Surrey, and George Fuller Golden (originally George Michael Fuller), a vaudeville entertainer. In 1912, her father died, "leaving a wife and four children destitute." She had a sister, Ruth Fuller Golden, who also acted in films.

Film 
Carey's screen debut was in Sorrowful Jones (1913). She next acted in Tess of the Storm Country (1914). (An obituary indicates that the name of her initial film was The Sorrowful Shore.) She appeared in more than 50 films, mostly westerns, including Gunfight at the O.K. Corral, often playing tough tomboy parts.

Television 
In 1956, Carey guest starred in the episode "Death in the Snow" of NBC's anthology series, The Joseph Cotten Show. In 1957 and 1958, Carey played Elsie, the live-in housekeeper, on the CBS sitcom Mr. Adams and Eve, which starred the then real-life married acting couple, Howard Duff and Ida Lupino. She subsequently appeared on the CBS sitcom Dennis the Menace, starring Jay North.

About this time, Carey was cast on two NBC westerns Cimarron City, with George Montgomery and John Smith, and The Restless Gun, starring John Payne. In 1960 and 1961, Carey performed the role of Casey, Macdonald Carey's (no relation) secretary, in several episodes of the television series Lock-Up.

On November 7, 1961, Carey played Ma Tolliver, the owner of a former stagecoach stop, in the episode "Deadly Is the Night" of NBC's Laramie western series. On April 22, 1962, she delivered a noteworthy performance as a bullying mother, "Ma" Martin, of three grown sons in the episode "The Youngest" of the ABC-Warner Brothers western series, Lawman.

Personal life 
In 1920, she wed actor Harry Carey, with whom she remained until his death in 1947. They had two children, a daughter Ellen and a son, actor Harry Carey, Jr. In 1928, the failure of the St. Francis Dam northwest of Los Angeles caused a flood, the damages of which included seven deaths on the Careys' ranch and a loss estimated at $750,000 ($ million today). As a result, when Harry Carey died in 1947, his estate was worth only about $15,000 ($ today).

Death 
Carey died of natural causes at the age of 92 at her home in Carpinteria, California.

Filmography

The Sorrowful Shore (1913) – The Orphan 
Tess of the Storm Country (1914) – Teola Graves
When the Gods Played a Badger Game (1915) – Marie – a Chorus Girl
Such Is Life (1915) – Olive Trent
Just Jim (1915) – Aunt Mary
The Millionaire Paupers (1915)
The Frame-Up (1915) – Nell Harter 
A Knight of the Range (1916) – Bess Dawson
Stampede in the Night (1916) – Nell Wilson
The Night Riders (1916) – Jennie Marston – the Sheriff's Sister
The Passing of Hell's Crown (1916) – Rose Graney
The Wedding Guest (1916) – Panchita
The Committee on Credentials (1916) – Josephine 
For the Love of a Girl (1916) – Jane Buckley – Cliff's Daughter 
Love's Lariat (1916) – Goldie Le Croix
A Woman's Eyes (1916) – Sunny Baker 
The Devil's Own (1916) – Vera Browning 
The Yellow Pawn (1916) 
Trader Horn (1931) – Edith Trent 
The Vanishing Legion (1931, Serial) – Nurse Lewis [Chs. 9–12]
Border Devils (1932) – Ethel Denham
Naughty Marietta (1935) – Madame Renavant (uncredited)
The Whip Hand (1951) – Mabel Turner
On Dangerous Ground (1951) – Mrs. Brent
Monkey Business (1952) – Johnny's Mother (uncredited)
Face to Face (1952) – Laura Lee ('The Bride Comes to Yellow Sky')
Affair with a Stranger (1953) – Cynthia Craig
Rogue Cop (1954) – Selma
The Cobweb (1955) – Mrs. O'Brien – Nurse
I Died a Thousand Times (1955) – Ma Goodhue
The Searchers (1956) – Mrs. Jorgenson
Pillars of the Sky (1956) – Mrs. Anne Avery
The Wings of Eagles (1957) –  Bridy O'Faolain (uncredited)
Gunfight at the O.K. Corral (1957) – Mrs. Clanton
Run of the Arrow (1957) – Mrs. O'Meara
Night Passage (1957) – Miss Vittles
The Alamo (1960) – Mrs. Dennison
Two Rode Together (1961) – Mrs. Abby Frazer
Billy the Kid vs. Dracula (1966) – Dr. Henrietta Hull (final film role)

Television
Mr. Adams and Eve – regular cast – Elsie (1957–1958)
Wagon Train – episode – Jesse Cowan Story – Porcas Beal (1958)
The Restless Gun - episode "The Peddler" (1958)
The Rifleman – episode – Shivaree – Ma Wilson (1959)
Tombstone Territory – episode – Trail’s End – Frieda Thompson (1959)
Dennis the Menace - episode - Man of the house - Mrs. Rafferty (1960)

References

External links

1896 births
1988 deaths
American film actresses
American silent film actresses
American television actresses
Actresses from New York City
People from Greater Los Angeles
People from Carpinteria, California
20th-century American actresses